The Right Combination is the debut album by American jazz pianist Joe Albany featuring saxophonist Warne Marsh which was recorded in 1957 for the Riverside label.

Reception

The Allmusic review states: "From the historical standpoint, this release is essential". The Penguin Guide to Jazz described it as "a jam at engineer Ralph Garretson's home, but for all its technical failings it does reveal a remarkable stylist".

Track listing
 "Daahoud" (Clifford Brown) – 4:56   
 "Angel Eyes" (Earl Brent, Matt Dennis) – 6:04   
 " I Love You" (Cole Porter) – 8:30   
 "Body and Soul" (Frank Eyton, Johnny Green, Edward Heyman, Robert Sour) – 8:24   
 "It's You or No One" (Sammy Cahn, Jule Styne) – 5:02   
 "All the Things You Are"  (Oscar Hammerstein II, Jerome Kern) – 7:20   
 "The Nearness of You" (Hoagy Carmichael, Ned Washington) – 2:13

Personnel 
Joe Albany – piano
Warne Marsh – tenor saxophone 
Bob Whitlock – bass

References 

1957 debut albums
Joe Albany albums
Warne Marsh albums
Riverside Records albums